St. Louis Country Club (SLCC) is a country club located in Ladue, Missouri, a suburb of St. Louis. It is recognized by the United States Golf Association (USGA) as one of the first 100 Clubs in America.

Club history
Founded in 1892 as a polo club, in 1895, the club moved to a site in the city of Clayton where it hired James Foulis, winner of the 1896 United States Open Golf Championship, to build a nine-hole course. The course opened in October 1896. In 1913, with Clayton becoming more populated, the club looked to move further west. It found a site at the corner of Ladue and Price Roads, owned by the Archdiocese of St. Louis. After some negotiations, the club purchased the land from the Archdiocese.

It then contracted with Charles Blair Macdonald to build a new 18-hole course. With golf chairman George Herbert Walker alongside, Macdonald began construction of the course. He hired Seth Raynor to do the engineering on the course, making the St. Louis course one of the few Macdonald-Raynor designs.

Macdonald, who was also among the founders of the United States Golf Association, was also the first champion of the United States Golf Association's Amateur Championship. The St. Louis course would be the furthest west Macdonald would go to design a course. Other courses he designed include National Golf Links of America, Sleepy Hollow, Piping Rock, Greenbrier's Old White Course, Yale Golf Course, the Mid Ocean Club, and the Chicago Golf Club.

Like many clubs throughout the United States, SLCC has a history of anti-Semitism and racism. Long considered a pinnacle of WASP culture in St. Louis, the club disaffiliated from the USGA in the early 1990s rather than admit any black members. As of 2006, the club had one black member.

The USGA Championships

1921 U.S. Amateur - First Amateur played west of the Mississippi

In 1919, Stewart Maiden left East Lake Golf Club in Atlanta, Georgia, to fulfill a promise he made if St. Louis was awarded the 1921 U.S. Amateur. He remained at St. Louis through 1921 as head professional before returning to East Lake. At the 1921 U.S. Amateur, a 19-year-old Bobby Jones was a participant, though he lost in the quarterfinals to Englishman Willie Hunter, the recent winner of the British Amateur. The Jones-Hunter match was well played during the early holes. However, on the 8th hole - the club's Cape Hole, Jones attempted to drive over the trees, which guarded the right side of the fairway. When his ball clipped a tree, it fell into the creek running down the right side, losing the hole. He never recovered and Hunter went on to win the match 2 and 1. In the other quarterfinal matches, Charles 'Chick' Evans downed Jess Sweetser 1up, while Robert A. Gardner defeated Rudy Knepper 4 and 3, and Jess Guilford bettered Harrison Johnston 1 up. With Guilford winning 5 and 4 over Evans in the semifinals, and Gardner defeating Hunter 6 and 5, the Finals pairing was set. In the championship match, Guilford defeated Gardner 7 and 6.

1925 U.S. Women's Amateur
In 1925, the St. Louis hosted the U.S. Women's Amateur. Alexa Stirling (Fraser), the 1916, 1919 and 1920 champion and the 1922 champion Glenna Collett (Vare) reached the finals, with Collett winning the final match 9 and 8 over Stirling. Collett would go on to win a total of six U.S. Women's Amateur Championships, with the last coming in 1935. Stirling, a 3-time U.S. Women's Amateur Champion, was another of the East Lake "whiz kids" taught by Stewart Maiden. Collett was a member of the first Curtis Cup team in 1932 and served as Captain on four occasions. In 1975, she was inducted into the World Golf Hall of Fame.

1947 U.S. Open
In 1947, St. Louis played host to the U.S. Open Championship. Among the favorites for the title were: Ben Hogan, Byron Nelson, Bobby Locke, Jim Ferrier, and Sam Snead. While it was generally believed that the course, playing 6,542 yards, would be overwhelmed by the players and that Ralph Guldahl's Ralph Guldahl record score of 64 would be broken, in the end, the pros would shoot no less than 67, with amateur Jim McHale Jr. posting the championship's lowest score of 65 in this third round. At the conclusion of 72-holes, Snead and Lew Worsham were tied with 282 totals, setting up a playoff on Sunday. (Before 1965, the final two rounds of the U.S. Open were played on Saturday)

The Playoff
During the 18-hole playoff, Worsham and Snead approached the 18th green, once again tied. Worsham chipped toward the hole, with his ball hitting the flagstick and settling 29 1/2 inches from the hole. Snead had a putt of approximately 15-feet, which he left short. Officials were called in by Worsham to measure which player was away. (In this era in golf, the continuous putting rule was not in effect, so the player furthest from the hole would putt first). The officials determined Snead was 30 1/2 inches from the hole. Snead, obviously upset with the delay, stood over his ball and missed the putt. Worsham calmly rolled in his putt to claim the U.S. Open crown.

1960 U.S. Amateur
In 1960, the club hosted the U.S. Amateur once again. Jack Nicklaus was the defending champion and was the odds-on favorite to win again. Other favorites included Deane Beman, Charles Coe, William Hyndman, Billy Joe Patton, William Campbell, Phil Rodgers, Harvie Ward, John Farquhar, and Robert W. Gardner.

The championship was played entirely at match play, with players seeded into four quadrants. Nicklaus won his first round match against John Donahue Jr., 1up, and then Ken Finke 4 and 3 in the second round. After defeating Phil Rogers 6 and 5 in the third round he met relative-unknown Charles Lewis of Little Rock, Arkansas. In perhaps one of the biggest upsets in U.S. Amateur history, Lewis defeated Nicklaus 5 and 3.

Meanwhile, Beman, who would become Commissioner of the PGA later in his career, was winning his matches with relative ease. In the quarterfinals he met Bill Hyndman, giving him his toughest match as Beman won 1up in 19 holes. After defeating Farquhar 5 and 4 in the semifinals, he dispatched Gardner 6 and 4 in the finals to win the Amateur title.

1972 U.S. Women's Amateur
In 1972, the USGA again called upon St. Louis to host a championship, this time the U.S. Women's Amateur. With a stellar field that included Laura Baugh, Carol Semple, Beth Daniel, Jane Bastanchury Booth, Mary Bea Porter, Deborah Massey, Cynthia Hill, and Barbara McIntire, it would be Mary Budke, from Dundee, Oregon, who would take the title. Though Budke would play some of the best golf of her career that week, her qualifying score of 161 was just one stroke inside of the qualifying number of 162. Budke won her first three matches by scores of 1up, 3 and 2, and 1up in 19 holes, to reach the semifinals. There she met Barbara Boddie, who was also playing very well that week. It would be a combination of Budke's solid play and Boddie's missed opportunities that would decide which of them would play for the title, as Budke won 1up in 19 holes for the victory. Her opponent would be Cynthia Hill from St. Petersburg, Florida. They had met earlier, with Hill getting the best of Budke in that previous match. However, in the match for the crown, Budke would prevail, earning a 5 and 4 victory.

2014 Curtis Cup Match

For the sixth time in the club's history, the club would host another USGA championship. However, this event would be a team competition, the 2014 Curtis Cup match between top female amateurs from the United States against those representing Great Britain and Ireland. Six-time USGA champion, St. Louisan Ellen Port (she would win a seventh USGA title, the U.S. Senior Women's Amateur in 2016), was selected as Captain for the U.S. squad.

With crowds of over 6,000 present over the three days of the Match, the U.S. team took a commanding 5–1 lead at the end of Friday's matches. They extended the lead to 9 1/2 to 2 1/2 at the close of the matches on Saturday. The individual matches on Sunday saw University of Alabama's Emma Talley, the 2012 U.S. Women's Amateur Champion, earn the deciding point on the fifteenth green as the U.S. team reclaimed the Curtis Cup. Besides Talley, other players on the U.S. squad were Kyung Kim, Alison Lee, Erynne Lee, Ally McDonald, Annie Park, Ashlan Ramsey, and Mariah Stackhouse.

Tournaments

Major championship

^ 18 hole playoffs: 1947

Amateur championships

International team competitions

References

Golfing Before The Arch: A history of Golf in St. Louis. Copyright 1996-2019 James F. Healey
St. Louis Country Club: A Legacy of Sports. Copyright 2009. James F. Healey
The 38th Curtis Cup Match Program. St. Louis Country Club, June 6–8, 2014. United States Golf Association and the Ladies Golf Union.

External links

2014 Curtis Cup site
Golf course information

See also

 Veiled Prophet Parade and Ball#After coronation

Golf clubs and courses in Missouri
Golf clubs and courses designed by Charles B. Macdonald
Buildings and structures in St. Louis County, Missouri
Curtis Cup venues
1892 establishments in Missouri